KZB or kzb may refer to:

 KZB, the IATA code for Zachar Bay Seaplane Base, Alaska, United States
 kzb, the ISO 639-3 code for Kaibobo language, Malukus, Indonesia